Tepidibacillus decaturensis is a Gram-negative, microaerophilic, rod-shaped and moderately thermophilic bacterium from the genus of Tepidibacillus which has been isolated from groundwater from the Mt. Simon Sandstone in Decatur in the United States.

References

External links 
Type strain of Tepidibacillus decaturensis at BacDive -  the Bacterial Diversity Metadatabase
 

Bacillaceae
Bacteria described in 2016